Coffee Cove is a settlement in Newfoundland and Labrador.  It reports sporadically in the census, though it is sometimes 'lumped' in with nearby places such as St. Patricks or Jackson's Cove.  There are currently about 25 residents.

Populated places in Newfoundland and Labrador